Jack Daniel Nolan (born 25 May 2001) is an English professional footballer who plays for Accrington Stanley as a winger. He started his career with the youth team of Reading before making his senior debut with Walsall. He has represented England at under-17 level.

Club career

Reading
Nolan was a regular feature in Reading's under-18 side from the age of 15 and, turning professional on his 17th birthday.

Walsall
On 16 January 2020, Nolan signed for League Two side Walsall for an undisclosed fee. Nolan made his senior professional debut in Walsall's 1–2 defeat at home to Crewe Alexandra on 1 February 2020.

Accrington Stanley
On 5 August 2021, Nolan signed for League One side Accrington Stanley.

International career
Nolan made his debut for England under-17s against Turkey on 18 August 2017 at St George's Park in the lead up to the 2017 U-17 World Cup. In November 2017, he returned to the team and scored the winning goal for the under-17s in a 2–1 victory against Germany.

Career statistics

References

2001 births
Living people
English footballers
Footballers from Portsmouth
Reading F.C. players
Walsall F.C. players
Accrington Stanley F.C. players
English Football League players
Association football wingers
England youth international footballers